Old Man on His Back Prairie and Heritage Conservation Area is a protected area of the Nature Conservancy of Canada (NCC) in the Canadian province of Saskatchewan. It is located in the RMs of Frontier No. 19 and Reno No. 51 and is centred around Old Man On His Back Plateau and surrounding prairie grasslands.

The land was previously a ranch owned by Peter and Sharon Butala. Since 1995, it has been run by the NCC, which leases the lands and fields for sustainable cattle grazing and managing pure plains bison. A herd of plains bison was introduced in 2003. Other animals found at the site include the swift fox, burrowing owl, Sprague's pipit, and herds of pronghorn. Also found at the property are numerous teepee rings that were left from former Indigenous encampments.

The site was designated a Nocturnal Preserve by the Royal Astronomical Society of Canada in 2015, the first in the country.

See also 
List of protected areas of Saskatchewan

References 

Reno No. 51, Saskatchewan
Frontier No. 19, Saskatchewan
Protected areas of Saskatchewan
Division No. 4, Saskatchewan